Rebekka Haase (born 2 January 1993) is a German athlete specialising in the sprinting events. She won three gold medals at the 2015 European U23 Championships, a gold medal at the 2017 IAAF World Relays, and became European Champion with the German 4 × 100 metres relay team in 2022.

Competition record

Abbreviations: h = heat (Q, q), sf = semi-final

Personal bests
Outdoor
100 metres – 11.06 (+1.8 m/s) (Zeulenroda 25 May 2017)
200 metres – 22.76 (+1.1 m/s) (Stockholm 18 June 2017)
Indoor
60 metres – 7.14 (Erfurt 27 January 2017)
200 metres – 22.77 (Leipzig 19 February 2017)
300 metres – 36.92 (Erfurt 27 January 2017)

References

1993 births
Living people
People from Zschopau
German female sprinters
Athletes (track and field) at the 2010 Summer Youth Olympics
World Athletics Championships athletes for Germany
Athletes (track and field) at the 2016 Summer Olympics
Athletes (track and field) at the 2020 Summer Olympics
Olympic athletes of Germany
European Athletics Championships winners
Olympic female sprinters
Sportspeople from Saxony